Parasram Mordiya (born 2 June 1950) is a senior Indian politician of Indian National Congress in state of Rajasthan and former chairman in Rajasthan Housing Board. He is former state minister of Rajasthan and former MLA, constituency of Lachhmangarh for five terms, 1977 to 1985 and 1990 to 2003.

References

Indian National Congress politicians
Living people
Rajasthan MLAs 1977–1980
Rajasthan MLAs 1980–1985
Rajasthan MLAs 1993–1998
Rajasthan MLAs 1990–1992
Rajasthan MLAs 1998–2003
Rajasthan MLAs 2018–2023
1950 births
Indian National Congress politicians from Rajasthan